Sara Ugarte de Salamanca (1866-1925) was a Bolivian poet and wife of Daniel Salamanca Urey. She was from Cochabamba. She campaigned to have a monument built to the local heroines who had fought trained soldiers in 1812.

Life
She was born in 1866 in Cochabamba. Her husband, Daniel Salamanca Urey, was also born in that city.

She campaigned to have a monument built to celebrate local heroes of the Bolivian War of Independence at the top of the hill of San Sebastián. Cochabamba, Bolivia. This was where battles were fought on the 27 May 12812. The women had resisted the forces of General Jose Manuel de Goyeneche. Ugarte founded and led the "27 de Mayo" Patriotic Society (precursor of the current Civic Women's Committee7), and fought to create a monument to the Heroines of the Crown. In 1926, a year after Ugarte's death, President Hernando Siles agreed that the monument could be built on the top of San Sebastián Hill. The celebrations lasted three days and included the inauguration of the 25 de Mayo market.

References 

Bolivian women poets
19th-century Bolivian women writers
20th-century Bolivian women writers
People from Cochabamba
1866 births
1925 deaths